Aleksei Vladimirovich Volkov (born 18 August 1998) is a Russian football player.

Club career
He made his debut in the Russian Football National League for FC Baltika Kaliningrad on 28 October 2018 in a game against FC Mordovia Saransk as an added-time substitute for Oleg Dmitriyev.

References

External links
 Profile by Russian Football National League

1998 births
Living people
Russian footballers
Association football midfielders
FC Baltika Kaliningrad players